Millay may refer to:

People
 Diana Millay (1940-2021), American actress
 Edna St. Vincent Millay (1892–1950), American lyrical poet and playwright
 George Millay (1929–2006), American businessman
 Tamara Millay (born 1967), Missouri politician

Fictional characters
 Millay (Suikoden), a character in the role playing game Suikoden IV
 Maeve Millay, a character in the TV series Westworld

Places
 Millay, Nièvre, a commune in the Nièvre department of France

Organizations
Millay Colony for the Arts, an artists' colony in Austerlitz, NY
Edna St. Vincent Millay Society, which holds the intellectual rights to the poet's work and runs Steepletop, the poet's house museum, in Austerlitz, New York

See also 
 Millais (disambiguation)